The Enterprise Planing Mill is a building in southeast Portland, Oregon, listed on the National Register of Historic Places.

Further reading

See also
 National Register of Historic Places listings in Southeast Portland, Oregon

References

External links
 

1915 establishments in Oregon
Buckman, Portland, Oregon
Buildings designated early commercial in the National Register of Historic Places
Industrial buildings and structures on the National Register of Historic Places in Portland, Oregon
Industrial buildings completed in 1915
Portland Eastside MPS